Phyllonorycter gerasimowi is a moth of the family Gracillariidae. It is known from Hungary, Thrace, southern and central Russia and Ukraine.

The larvae feed on Malus domestica. They mine the leaves of their host plant. They create an upper-surface tentiform mine.

References

gerasimowi
Moths of Europe
Moths described in 1930